Doug McMurdy (February 9, 1926 – May 16, 2010) was a Canadian professional ice hockey player, and coach. He played both centre and defence, and skated for 376 games in the American Hockey League, mostly with the Springfield Indians. McMurdy was the inaugural winner of the Red Tilson Trophy, as the most outstanding junior player in the Ontario Hockey Association (OHA) in 1945.

Amateur career
Doug McMurdy was born on February 9, 1926, in Winnipeg, Manitoba. He was brought to the St. Catharines Falcons for the 1943–44 OHA season by fellow Manitoban and coach Rudy Pilous. In his second year of junior hockey, McMurdy won the inaugural Red Tilson Trophy for the 1944–45 OHA season as the most valuable player, and was the top scoring defenceman in the league.

Professional career
McMurdy signed with the Toronto Maple Leafs in 1945, for a salary of $5000 and bonus of $1200. He was converted to a centre by Leafs coach Hap Day, and assigned to the minor leagues. His first season in the AHL was played with the Pittsburgh Hornets, then two seasons with the Tulsa Oilers in the United States Hockey League.

McMurdy was traded to Springfield in 1948, and played the next nine seasons under the control of team owner, Eddie Shore. Teams in the National Hockey League inquired about McMurdy, but Shore declined offers to sell or trade him. When Shore moved his AHL team to Syracuse, he assigned McMurdy to the farm team in Springfield partway though the 1951–52 season. McMurdy was named the player–coach for the Springfield Indians for the next two seasons. He led the Springfield Indians to the Walker Cup as regular season champions in the Eastern Amateur Hockey League in 1952–53, but the Indians lost in the playoff finals to the Johnstown Jets. McMurdy and the Indians moved up to the Quebec Hockey League for the 1953–54 season. The team struggled and finished last place. Shore returned his AHL team to Springfield in 1954, and McMurdy played the next three seasons in the AHL with the Indians. He finished his AHL career in Springfield with 85 goals, 182 assists, and 267 points in 286 games.

McMurdy played the 1957–58 season with the Trois-Rivières Lions in the QHL, then finished his career playing defence for New Haven Blades in the 1958–59 season.

Later life and honours
McMurdy was inducted into Springfield Hockey Hall of Fame in 2000. He died on May 16, 2010, in West Brookfield, Massachusetts.

Playing statistics
Career statistics as a player.

Coaching statistics
Career statistics as a player-coach.

References

External links
 

1926 births
2010 deaths
Canadian expatriate ice hockey players in the United States
Canadian ice hockey centres
Canadian ice hockey coaches
Ice hockey people from Winnipeg
New Haven Blades players
Pittsburgh Hornets players
Quebec Senior Hockey League players
Springfield Indians players
St. Catharines Falcons (OHA) players
Syracuse Warriors players
Tulsa Oilers (USHL) players